Francis O'Beirne (1833 – 11 April 1899) was an Irish Home Rule League politician. He served as a Member of Parliament (MP) for Leitrim from 1876 to 1885.

He first stood for election in Leitrim in 1874 but was unsuccessful. He was then elected at a by-election in 1876 and held the seat until it was abolished in 1885.

References

External links
 

1833 births
1899 deaths
Home Rule League MPs
Members of the Parliament of the United Kingdom for County Leitrim constituencies (1801–1922)
UK MPs 1874–1880
UK MPs 1880–1885